CWD may refer to:

Biology
 Cantabrian Water Dog, Spanish dog breed
 Cell wall-deficient bacteria (or L forms)
 Chronic wasting disease, of deer
 Coarse woody debris, fallen trees and branches
 Coffee wilt disease, in coffee trees
 Common and well-documented, of human leukocyte antigen alleles

Train stations
 Chatswood railway station, Sydney, Australia
 Chawinda railway station, Punjab province, Pakistan
 Creswell railway station, Derbyshire, England

Other uses
 Canada's Worst Driver, a television series (2005–2018)
 Clwyd, a preserved county of Wales (in genealogy)
 Current working directory, in computing
 Woods Cree language, spoken in Canada (ISO 639-3:cwd)